Amaia Andrés Berakoetxea (born 26 June 1966 in San Sebastián) is a retired Spanish middle-distance runner who competed primarily in the 800 metres. She represented her country at the 1992 Summer Olympics, and twice at both the IAAF World Indoor Championships and European Athletics Indoor Championships. She won two bronze medals at the Mediterranean Games, in the 4 × 400 metres relay in the 1991 and the 800 m in 1993.

She holds personal bests of 2:02.67 minutes for the 800 metres and 4:25.05 for the 1500 metres. She retired from competition after 1996. She was a seven-time national champion in the 800 m, six times outdoors and once indoors.

International competitions

National titles
Spanish Athletics Championships
800 metres: 1986, 1991, 1992, 1993, 1994, 1995
Spanish Indoor Athletics Championships
800 metres: 1993

Personal bests
Outdoor
800 metres – 2:02.67 (Barcelona 1992)
1500 metres – 4:25.05 (Seville 1993)
Indoor
800 metres – 2:03.76 (Toronto 1993)
1000 metres – 2:42.51 (Madrid 1994)

References

External links
All-Athletics profile
Basque Encyclopedia entry

1966 births
Living people
Sportspeople from San Sebastián
Spanish female middle-distance runners
Olympic female middle-distance runners
Olympic athletes of Spain
Athletes (track and field) at the 1992 Summer Olympics
Mediterranean Games competitors for Spain
Mediterranean Games bronze medalists for Spain
Mediterranean Games medalists in athletics
Athletes (track and field) at the 1991 Mediterranean Games
Athletes (track and field) at the 1993 Mediterranean Games
Spanish Athletics Championships winners
Athletes from the Basque Country (autonomous community)